Stig Kjell Olof "Ola" Ullsten (23 June 1931 – 28 May 2018) was a Swedish politician and diplomat who was Prime Minister of Sweden from 1978 to 1979 and leader of the Liberal People's Party from 1978 to 1983. He also served as Deputy Prime Minister briefly in 1978 and then again from 1980 to 1982 and served as Minister for Foreign Affairs from 1979 to 1982.

Background and early career
Ullsten was born in Teg, Västerbotten, a small town that would ultimately be annexed as a part of county capital Umeå. He is the son of forestry inspector Carl Augustin Ullsten (14 August 1892 – 27 March 1977) and schoolteacher Kristina Ullsten (née Röström; 27 February 1900 – 23 March 1993). Ullsten joined the Liberal Youth of Sweden and the People's Party in the spring of 1958.

In his youth he made several travels to the United States, and in 1959 took an active part in the successful campaign to elect liberal Republican Nelson Rockefeller governor of New York. He served as the head of the Liberal Youth of Sweden between 1962 and 1964 and was elected to parliament in 1964.

Ministerial and political appointments
Upon the formation in 1976 of the first non-socialist government in Sweden in 40 years, he was appointed Minister for International Development. When Liberal Party leader Per Ahlmark resigned in 1978, Ullsten was elected party leader.

Prime Minister of Sweden
Sweden's center-right coalition government broke up later in 1978, mainly owing to disagreements over energy policy. Ullsten then succeeded to the post of Prime Minister of Sweden, heading a minority government consisting of Liberal Party and independent ministers. After the successful survival of the coalition in the 1979 parliamentary elections, he resigned as prime minister in favor of Thorbjörn Fälldin, his predecessor.

Later career
He then went on to serve as Minister for Foreign Affairs under the new three-party government of Thorbjörn Fälldin from 1979 to 1982. He has later served as the Swedish Ambassador to Canada, also accredited to The Bahamas from 1984 to 1989 and Italy, also accredited to Albania from 1989 to 1995.

Personal life
In 1961 he married Evi Esko (29 October 1931 – 2 January 1992), daughter of the teachers Roman Esko and Elsa Tammik. They divorced in 1981 and in 1989 Ullsten married Louise Beaudoin (born 1954).

Ullsten died on 28 May 2018 at the age of 86 of natural causes.

Awards 
Ullsten was awarded the Illis quorum by the government of Sweden in 2001.

Bibliography
 Folkpartiet och reformerna : liberala riksdagsinitiativ 1902-1960 (1960)
 Guide-lines for international development co-operation (1978)
 Liberaler om utveckling (1978)
 Sweden and the developing countries (1979)
 Vad ska vi göra med kulturpolitiken? : anföranden och kommentarer kring den svenska kulturpolitikens "fem-årsdag" (1979)
 Lättsinnet i siffror : en sammanfattning av socialdemokraternas ställningstaganden till de 15 viktigaste besparingsförslagen  (1982)
 Kämpande liberalism : anförande (1982)
 Ola Ullsten : partiledaren, demokraten, internationalisten, folkpartisten, statsministern, idédebattören (1983)
 Så blev det (2013)

See also 
 Ullsten Cabinet

References 

1931 births
2018 deaths
People from Umeå
Liberals (Sweden) politicians
Prime Ministers of Sweden
Deputy Prime Ministers of Sweden
Swedish Ministers for Foreign Affairs
Swedish Ministers for International Development Cooperation
Leaders of political parties in Sweden
Ambassadors of Sweden to Canada
Ambassadors of Sweden to the Bahamas
Ambassadors of Sweden to Italy
Ambassadors of Sweden to Albania
Members of the Riksdag 1970–1973
Members of the Riksdag 1976–1979
Members of the Riksdag 1979–1982
Members of the Riksdag 1982–1985
Recipients of the Illis quorum